The Lycoming XR-7755 was the largest piston aircraft engine ever built in the United States, with 36 cylinders totaling about 7,750 in³ (127 L) of displacement and a power output of 5,000 horsepower (3,700 kilowatts). It was originally intended to be used in the "European bomber" that eventually emerged as the Convair B-36. Only two examples were built before the project was terminated in 1946.

Development
Lycoming had not been successful in designing a high-power engine. They had started with an attempt to make a hyper engine that led to the 1,200 hp (890 kW) O-1230; by the time the engine was ready, however, new aircraft designs were all calling for more power. They tried again by "twinning" the engine to produce the H block H-2470, which saw some interest in the Vultee XP-54 "Swoose Goose" project. Work on the H-2470 ended when the XP-54 was cancelled.

In one final attempt, Lycoming decided to go all out and build what would turn out to be the largest displacement aircraft piston engine in the world. They put together a team under the direction of VP of Engineering Clarence Wiegman at their main Williamsport factory in the summer of 1943 and started work.

Design
The resulting design used four banks of nine cylinders each at a 40° angle to each adjacent cylinder, arranged around a central crankshaft , to form a four-row radial engine. Unlike most multi-row radials, which "spiral" the cylinders to allow cooling air to reach them, the R-7755 was water-cooled, and so each of the cylinder heads in a cylinder bank were in-line within a cooling jacket.

Each cylinder bank had a single overhead camshaft actuating the poppet valves. The camshaft included two sets of cams, one for full takeoff power, and another for economical cruise. The pilot could select between the two settings, which would shift the camshaft along its axis to bring the other set of cams over the valve stems. The design mounted some of the accessories on the "front side" of the camshafts, namely two magnetos and four distributors. The seventh camshaft was not used in this fashion, its location on the front of the engine was used to feed oil to the propeller reduction gearing.

The original XR-7755-1 design drove a single propeller, but even on the largest aircraft the propeller needed to absorb the power would have been ridiculously large. This led to a minor redesign that produced the XR-7755-3, using a new propeller gearing system driving a set of coaxial shafts to power a set of contra-rotating propellers. The propeller reduction gearing also had two speed settings to allow for a greater range of operating power than adjustable props alone could deliver. Another minor modification resulted in the XR-7755-5, the only change being the replacement of carburetors with a new fuel injection system.

Operational history
A second example was provided, as planned, to the United States Army Air Forces at Wright Field in 1946. However, by this time the Air Force had lost interest in new piston designs due to the introduction of jet engines. The original test engine was later delivered to the Smithsonian Institution, where it was recently restored.

Specifications (XR-7755)

See also

Notes

References

Further reading
 
 Correspondence with Kimble D. McCutcheon of the Aircraft Engine Historical Society, who provided original specifications sheets, the image used above, as well as valuable comments.
 :- This source contains a number of mis-translated metric figures

External links

 Lycoming XR-7755 at Aviationhistory.com
 Letter to the Editor on the XR-7755 at GeneralAviationNews.com

Abandoned military aircraft engine projects of the United States
1940s aircraft piston engines
R-7755
Inline radial engines
Water-cooled radial engines